Ptilodactyla angustata is a species of toe-winged beetle in the family Ptilodactylidae. It is found in North America.

References

Further reading

 

Byrrhoidea
Articles created by Qbugbot
Beetles described in 1880